Gabriadze is a surname and may refer to:
 Levan Gabriadze (born 1969), Georgian-Russian actor and film director
 Revaz Gabriadze (1936–2021), Georgian theatre and film director, playwright, writer, painter and sculptor

Georgian-language surnames